Paw (also known as Boy of Two Worlds) is a 1959 Danish film directed by Astrid Henning-Jensen.

Plot
A boy from the Caribbean, affected by the deaths of his parents and maiden aunt, escapes to the Danish forest.

Cast
Edvin Adolphson as Anders
Jimmy Sterman as Paw
Asbjørn Andersen as Gutsbesitzer
Ninja Tholstrup as Yvonne
Helge Kjærulff-Schmidt as Lehrer
Karen Lykkehus as Fräulein Bo
Preben Neergaard as Søofficer
Karl Stegger as Betjent Hansen
Ebba Amfeldt as Fru Hansen
Svend Bille as Onkel Pot
Ego Brønnum-Jacobsen as Mand ved skydetelt
Otto Hallstrøm
Mogens Hermansen as Godsejerens skytte
Grethe Høholdt as Betjentens datter Inger
Finn Lassen as Forstander på børnehjemmet

Release and reception
Paw was originally released in Denmark in December 1959. It was nominated for the Academy Award for Best Foreign Language Film and was entered into the 1960 Cannes Film Festival. In the United States, the film was released in April 1970 by G. G. Communications under the title Boy from Two Worlds; twelve minutes were cut from the original 100-minute running time. In his Family Guide to Movies on Video, Henry Herx deemed it "a very engaging children's movie ... that will also interest adults".

See also
List of submissions to the 32nd Academy Awards for Best Foreign Language Film
List of Danish submissions for the Academy Award for Best Foreign Language Film

References

External links

1959 films
1959 drama films
Danish drama films
1950s Danish-language films
Films directed by Astrid Henning-Jensen